The Story So Far may refer to:


Books 
 The Story of Sar (book), a 2003 book by Bhawana Somaaya

Films 
The Story So Far (2001 film), a film about the band Sick of It All
The Story So Far (2002 film), a documentary about the band New Found Glory

Music

Albums
The Story So Far (Divine album), a 1984 album
The Story So Far (Bucks Fizz album), a 1988 compilation album
The Story So Far (Keith Urban album), a 2012 compilation album
The Story So Far (Mo-dettes album), a 1981 album
The Story So Far... (Mostly Autumn album), a 2001 live album
The Story So Far... (Supertramp album), a live album\documentary by Supertramp
The Story So Far: The Very Best of Rod Stewart, a 2001 greatest hits album
The Story So Far (Spunge album), a 2002 album
The Story So Far... (Lúnasa album), a 2008 greatest hits album
The Story So Far – The Best Of Def Leppard, a 2018 compilation album
Moby (album), titled The Story So Far in the UK, 1992

Bands
The Story So Far (band), a pop punk band from Walnut Creek, California
The Story So Far (The Story So Far album), the band's self-titled album

Songs
"The Story So Far", a 1973 song by Roger Daltrey from the album Daltrey
"The Story So Far", a song by New Found Glory from the 2002 album Sticks and Stones
"The Story So Far", a song by Tygers of Pan Tang from the 1981 album Spellbound
"The Story So Far", a 2003 single by Edyta Górniak
"The Story So Far", a song by Flogging Molly from the 2008 album Float

Other
The Story So Far Tour by James Arthur